Labëria FC is an Albanian professional football club based in Vlorë. They are currently competing in the Kategoria e Dytë.

Current squad

 *

See also
List of football clubs in Albania

References

Football clubs in Albania
2019 establishments in Albania
Association football clubs established in 2019
Sport in Vlorë
Albanian Third Division clubs
Kategoria e Dytë clubs